Hakewill is a surname, and may refer to:

 Edward Charles Hakewill (1816–1872), English church architect
 Edmund Hakewill-Smith (1896–1986), South African-born British General
 George Hakewill (d.1649), English clergyman and author
 Geraldine Hakewill (born 1987), Australian actress and singer-songwriter
 Henry Hakewill (1771–1830), English architect
 James Hakewill (1778–1843), English architect, best known for his illustrated publications
 John Hakewill (1742–1791), English painter and interior decorator
 John Henry Hakewill (1810–1880), English architect
 William Hakewill (1574–1655), English legal antiquarian and Member of parliament